The 2014 Malaysian Open, Kuala Lumpur was a professional tennis tournament played on hard courts. It was the sixth edition of the tournament, and part of the 2014 ATP World Tour. It took place in Kuala Lumpur, Malaysia between 22 and 28 September 2014.

Singles main-draw entrants

Seeds

 Rankings are as of 15 September 2014

Other entrants 
The following players received wild cards into the singles main draw:
  Taro Daniel
  Omar Jasika
  Filip Krajinović

The following players received entry from the singles qualifying draw:
  Philipp Oswald
  Philipp Petzschner
  Kento Takeuchi
  James Ward

Withdrawals 
Before the tournament
  Kevin Anderson
  Juan Martín del Potro
  Marcel Granollers
  Mikhail Kukushkin
  Milos Raonic
  Dominic Thiem
  Dmitry Tursunov

Doubles main-draw entrants

Seeds

 Rankings are as of 15 September 2014

Other entrants 
The following pairs received wildcards into the doubles main draw:
  Nick Kyrgios /  Syed Mohd Agil Syed Naguib
  Jürgen Melzer /  Philipp Petzschner

Withdrawals 
Before the tournament
  Marin Draganja (back injury)

Champions

Singles

  Kei Nishikori def.  Julien Benneteau, 7–6(7–4), 6–4

Doubles

  Marcin Matkowski /  Leander Paes def.  Jamie Murray /  John Peers, 3–6, 7–6(7–5), [10–5]

External links
 Official website

Malaysian Open, Kuala Lumpur
Malaysian Open, Kuala Lumpur
Open